The 1975–76 Maltese First Division was the 61st season of top-tier football in Malta.  It was contested by 10 teams, and Sliema Wanderers F.C. won the championship.

League standings

Third Place tie-breaker
With both Hibernians and Zebbug Rangers level on 20 points, a play-off match was conducted to qualification for the UEFA Cup

Results

References
Malta - List of final tables (RSSSF)

Maltese Premier League seasons
Malta
Premier